Aleksandr Markov may refer to:

 Aleksandr Markov (equestrian) (born 1985), Russian eventing rider

See also
 Alexander Markov, Russian American violinist
 Alexander V. Markov (born 1965), Russian biologist, paleontologist and popularizer of science